Life is a Big Holiday For Us is the second album by Brazilian rock band Black Drawing Chalks. The record was produced by Eduardo Ramos (former manager of Cansei de Ser Sexy), Fabrício Nobre and Gustavo Vasquez at Rocklab studios. The track My Favorite Way become the band's first big hit, and its video was featured on MTV Brasil, being nominated to MTV VMB 2009.

Track listing 
"My Favorite Way"
"Free From Desire"
"My Radio"
"The Legend"
"Girl I've Come To Lay You Down"
"Finding Another Road"
"I'm A Beast, I'm A Gun"
"Don't Take My Beer"
"Precious Stone"
"Magic Travel"
"Leaving Home"

External links
 Free download of the album at Trama Virtual

2009 albums
Black Drawing Chalks albums